Every Dog Has His Day is an album by the American band Let's Active, released in 1988. It was the band's final album.

The title track peaked at No. 17 on Billboard'''s Modern Rock Tracks chart. The band promoted the album by touring with Velvet Elvis.

Production
Recorded in Wales, the album was produced by John Leckie and frontman Mitch Easter. It was mixed at Abbey Road Studios. Determined that the album be more of a band effort, Let's Active also worked to create a heavier sound. New member John Heames played bass on Every Dog Has His Day.

Critical receptionTrouser Press wrote that "the best songs ... are classic Easter: unsettled emotional lyrics and eccentric pop melodies that have him straining on vocal tiptoes to reach the hard bits." The Chicago Reader called the album "lush and bountiful and weird: a gorgeous song like 'Horizon' ... has a twangy feedback that turbocharges the backing track."The Globe and Mail determined that "Easter's heavily layered approach to his sixties psychedelia, punk and pop roots [allow] the band to put all sorts of new twists on old sounds." The Orlando Sentinel stated that "two things dominate from beginning to end—jangling rock 'n' roll guitar and sharp, witty writing." The Omaha World-Herald opined that "Easter's trademark, nasal singing occasionally can be irritating, but that is easily overshadowed by the band's high-energy guitars."

AllMusic wrote that the album "features an overall heavier vibe, with the band rocking like never before, emphasizing a love of hard rock only briefly hinted at on earlier albums, and it's all done very well." The Rolling Stone Album Guide'' concluded that "muscular drumming and raucous powerchords now augment the jangly guitar of yore."

Track listing

References

1988 albums
I.R.S. Records albums